The Dodge EPIC was a concept electric car created by Dodge. The EPIC was first shown at the 1992 North American International Auto Show. EPIC stands for Electric Power Interurban Commuter.

Engine and Design
The design was at the time more futuristic. Unlike any other minivan, the EPIC had the modern oval-shaped body, this style was inspiration for the design of the third generation of the Chrysler Minivans.

This vehicle has been seen in the 1994 NBC TV series Viper.

Reintroduction

Chrysler Corporation originally had plans to reintroduce the EV minivan, and introduced concepts such as the Chrysler EV and Chrysler ecoVoyager. The van would have specifications that were similar to the EPIC. Chrysler killed off the plan in 2011, and sold its Global Electric Motorcars brand to the ATV and snowmobile manufacturer Polaris shortly after.

References
ConceptCarz.com Info for the EPIC
Chrysler’s Electric Cars and Minivans: TEVan, EPIC, ENVI, and more
1999 Dodge EPIC

EPIC